Tatiana Baganova is an international contemporary dance choreographer from the Tyumen Oblast region of Russia. Baganova is the artistic director of Yekaterinburg's Provincial Dances Theatre.

References

Living people
Year of birth missing (living people)
Choreographers of Bolshoi Theatre
Russian choreographers